The 2017 TheHouse.com 300 was the 26th stock car race of the 2017 NASCAR Xfinity Series season, the final race of the regular season, and the 17th iteration of the event. The race was held on Saturday, September 16, 2017, in Joliet, Illinois, at Chicagoland Speedway, a 1.5 miles (2.41 km) tri-oval speedway. The race took the scheduled 200 laps to complete. At race's end, Justin Allgaier, driving for JR Motorsports, would manage to pull away from the field on the final restart with seven to go to win his fifth career NASCAR Xfinity Series victory and his second and final win of the season. To fill out the podium, Kyle Larson, driving for Chip Ganassi Racing, and Elliott Sadler, driving for JR Motorsports, would finish second and third, respectively.

The twelve drivers to qualify for the 2017 NASCAR Xfinity Series Chase field were William Byron, Justin Allgaier, Elliott Sadler, Daniel Hemric, Brennan Poole, Ryan Reed, Jeremy Clements, Cole Custer, Blake Koch, Matt Tifft, Brendan Gaughan, and Michael Annett.

Background 

Chicagoland Speedway is a  tri-oval speedway in Joliet, Illinois, southwest of Chicago. The speedway opened in 2001 and currently hosts NASCAR races. Until 2011, the speedway also hosted the IndyCar Series, recording numerous close finishes, including the closest finish in IndyCar history. The speedway is owned and operated by International Speedway Corporation and is located adjacent to Route 66 Raceway.

Entry list 

 (R) denotes rookie driver.
 (i) denotes driver who is ineligible for series driver points.

Practice

First practice 
The first practice session was held on Friday, September 15, at 1:00 PM CST. The session would last for 55 minutes.

Second and final practice 
The final practice session, sometimes known as Happy Hour, was held on Friday, September 15, at 3:00 PM CST. The session would last for 50 minutes.

Qualifying 
Qualifying was held on Saturday, September 16, at 11:35 AM CST. Since Chicagoland Speedway is under 2 miles (3.2 km) in length, the qualifying system was a multi-car system that included three rounds. The first round was 15 minutes, where every driver would be able to set a lap within the 15 minutes. Then, the second round would consist of the fastest 24 cars in Round 1, and drivers would have 10 minutes to set a lap. Round 3 consisted of the fastest 12 drivers from Round 2, and the drivers would have 5 minutes to set a time. Whoever was fastest in Round 3 would win the pole.

No drivers would fail to qualify.

Full qualifying results

Race results 
Stage 1 Laps: 45

Stage 2 Laps: 45

Stage 3 Laps: 110

Standings after the race 

Drivers' Championship standings

Note: Only the first 12 positions are included for the driver standings.

References 

2017 NASCAR Xfinity Series
NASCAR races at Chicagoland Speedway
September 2017 sports events in the United States
2017 in sports in Illinois